While Thousands Cheer is a lost American film released in 1940. Leo C. Popkin directed. It was the only football-themed film with an African American lead character for decades. It starred Kenny Washington, a football star from UCLA who went on to become the first African American in the NFL after initially being refused an opportunity to play in the league due to segregation.

Plot 
The film is a football melodrama. The plot was said to be based on true stories about gambling and corruption in football at a specific Black college. The story follows a star football player and his brother as they get involved with, and later break up, a gambling ring's attempting to "fix" a college game.

Cast 
The film featured a mostly African American cast, including UCLA football star Kenny Washington, who was denied entry to the segregated NFL for several years. The film was Washington's first movie role. Jeni Le Gon played the leading actress.
Kenny Washington as Kenny Harrington
Mantan Moreland as Nash
Pete Webster as Downey
Jeni Le Gon as Myra
Reginald Fenderson as Phil Harrington
Lawrence Criner as Green
Monte Hawley as Johnson
Florence O'Brien as Daisy
Ida Belle Kauffin as Rose
Bud Harris as Coach Harding
Earl Hall as Jerry Stevens
John Thomas as Jack Saunders/Spike
Reginald Anderson as Umpire
Jack Spears as Referee
Alfred Grant as Radio announcer
Edward Thompson (actor) as Ransom

Production 
The film was produced by Clifford Sanforth and Million Dollar Pictures. The premiere date was moved back due to requests from theatre managers that the film be released around the same time as other football films, to "get the minds of the public on football" and increase attendance at the theatres.

Reception 
The film was praised in a review by the Hollywood Daily Variety. The Cleveland Call and Post called it "one of the most exciting, interest holding pictures ever filmed to entertain the young and old, male and female, of all races."

References

External links
Items related to While Thousands Cheer in the collection of the Oakland Museum of California

Race films
American sports drama films
American football films
1940 drama films
1940 films
1940 lost films
Lost American films
Lost sports drama films
1940s sports drama films
Films directed by Leo C. Popkin
1940s American films